Borot may refer to:

People
Mickaël Borot (born 1975), French Taekwondo athlete

Fiction
Boss Borot  mecha character from the anime and manga series Mazinger Z
Borot, character in Power Quest (video game)

See also
Borat (disambiguation)
Borut (disambiguation)